

Incumbents
 American Samoa (U.S. territory)
Togiola Tulafono, Governor of American Samoa (2003–present)
 Australia
 Monarch – Elizabeth II, Queen of Australia (1952–present)
 Governor-General - Michael Jeffery, Governor-General of Australia (2003–present)
 Prime Minister – John Howard, Prime Minister of Australia (1996–present)
 Cook Islands (self-governing territory of New Zealand)
 High Commissioner - John Bryan, High Commissioner of the Cook Islands (2005–present)
 Queen's Representative - Frederick Goodwin, Queen's Representative in the Cook Islands (2001–present)
 Prime Minister – Jim Marurai, Prime Minister of the Cook Islands (2004–present)
 East Timor
President - Xanana Gusmão, President of East Timor (2002–present)
Prime Minister - Marí Alkatiri,  (2002 – 26 June 2006), José Ramos-Horta (8 July 2006–present)
 Fiji
 President - Ratu Josefa Iloilo, President of Fiji (2000–2009)
 Prime Minister – Laisenia Qarase, Prime Minister of Fiji (2001–2006)
 French Polynesia (French Overseas Country)
 High Commissioner - Anne Boquet, High Commissioner of French Polynesia (acting) (2005–present)
 President of the Government - Oscar Temaru, President of the Government of French Polynesia (2005–December 2006). Gaston Tong Sang (December 26, 2006 onward)
 Guam
 Governor - Felix Perez Camacho, Governor of Guam (2003–present):
 Hawaii
 Governor - Linda Lingle (R)|
 Senators - Daniel Inouye (D) Daniel Akaka (D)
 Representatives - Neil Abercrombie (D) Ed Case (D)
 Kiribati
President - Anote Tong, President of Kiribati (2003–present)
 Marshall Islands
President - Kessai Note, President of the Marshall Islands (2000–present)
 Federated States of Micronesia
President - Joseph Urusemal, President of the Federated States of Micronesia (2003–present)
 Nauru
President - Ludwig Scotty, President of Nauru (2004–present)
 New Caledonia (French Overseas Country)
 High Commissioner - Michel Mathieu, High Commissioner of New Caledonia (2005–present)
 President of the Government - Marie-Noëlle Thémereau, President of the Government of New Caledonia (2004–present)
 New Zealand
 Monarch – Elizabeth II, Queen of New Zealand  (1952–present)
 Governor-General - Dame Silvia Cartwright, Governor-General of New Zealand (2001–2006)
 Prime Minister – Helen Clark, Prime Minister of New Zealand (1999–present)
 Niue (associated state of New Zealand)
 Resident Commissioner - Sandra Lee-Vercoe, Resident Commissioner of Niue (2003–present)
 Prime Minister – Young Vivian, Prime Minister of Niue (2002–present)
 Norfolk Island
 Administrator - Grant Tambling, Administrator of Norfolk Island (2003–present)
 Chief Minister -
 Geoffrey Robert Gardner, Chief Minister of Norfolk Island (2001–2006)
 David Buffett, Chief Minister of Norfolk Island (2006–present)
 Northern Mariana Islands (Commonwealth of the U.S.)
 Governor - Juan Babauta, Governor of the Northern Mariana Islands (2002–present)
 Palau
President - Tommy Remengesau, President of Palau (2001–present)
 Papua New Guinea
 Monarch – Elizabeth II, Queen of Papua New Guinea (1975–present)
 Governor-General - Sir Paulias Matane, Governor-General of Papua New Guinea (2004–present)
 Prime Minister – Sir Michael Somare, Prime Minister of Papua New Guinea (2002–present)
 Bougainville - Joseph Kabui, President of Bougainville Autonomous Government (2005–present)
 Pitcairn Islands (overseas territory of the United Kingdom)
 Governor - Richard Fell, Governor of the Pitcairn Islands (2001–present)
 Commissioner - Leslie Jacques, Commissioner of the Pitcairn Islands (2003–present)
 Mayor - Jay Warren, Mayor of the Pitcairn Islands (2004–present)
 Samoa
 Monarch – Malietoa Tanumafili II, Head of State of Samoa (1963–present)
 Prime Minister – Tuila'epa Sailele Malielegaoi, Prime Minister of Samoa (1998–present)
 Solomon Islands
 Monarch – Elizabeth II, Queen of the Solomon Islands (1978–present)
 Governor-General - Nathaniel Waena, Governor-General of the Solomon Islands (2004–present)
 Prime Minister – Sir Allan Kemakeza, Prime Minister of the Solomon Islands (2001–present)
 Tokelau (territory of New Zealand)
 Administrator - Neil Walter, Administrator of Tokelau (2003–present)
 Head of Government - Pio Tuia, Head of Government (2005–present)
 Tonga
 Monarch
Tāufaāhau Tupou IV, King of Tonga (1965–2006)
George Tupou V (2006–present)
 Prime Minister -
 Ahoeitu Unuakiotonga Tukuaho (Lavaka Ata Ulukālala), Prime Minister of Tonga (2000–2006)
 Feleti Sevele, Acting Prime Minister of Tonga (2006–present)
 Tuvalu
 Monarch – Elizabeth II, Queen of Tuvalu (1978–present)
 Governor-General - Filoimea Telito, Governor-General of Tuvalu (2005–present)
 Prime Minister – Maatia Toafa, Prime Minister of Tuvalu (2004–August 14, 2006), then Apisai Ielemia.
 Vanuatu
 President - Kalkot Mataskelekele, President of Vanuatu (2004–present)
 Prime Minister – Ham Lini, Prime Minister of Vanuatu (2004–present)
 Wallis and Futuna (French overseas collectivity)
 Administrator-Superior - Xavier de Furst Administrator-Superior of Wallis and Futuna (2005–present)
 President of the Territorial Assembly - Apeleto Likuvalu President of the Territorial Assembly (2005–present)

Events

January

February
February 13: Tongan Prime Minister Prince Ahoeitu Unuakiotonga Tukuaho (Lavaka Ata Ulukālala) resigns suddenly on 11 February 2006, and also gives up his other cabinet portfolios. He was replaced in the interim by the elected Minister of Labour, Dr. Feleti Sevele. (Pacific Magazine)
February 16: Tokelau will remain a New Zealand territory after a referendum on independence. A 60 percent majority voted in favor of independence, but a two-thirds majority was required for the referendum to succeed.
February 20: Retired scientist Don Kennedy suggests the entire population of Tuvalu should move to the Fijian island of Kioa, to preserve Tuvaluan culture as their homeland becomes uninhabitable due to rising sea levels. (Pacific Islands)
February 20: The Papua New Guinea Electoral Boundaries Commission presents its report suggesting 26 new Open electorates be created for the scheduled 2007 election. (The National)
February 20: Officials in Guam warn people not to eat fish caught in Merizo's Cocos Lagoon due to major polychlorinated biphenyl (PCB) contamination from a former United States Coast Guard station on Cocos Island. (Pacific Daily News)
February 24: Benigno R. Fitial announces the Northern Mariana Islands will host the 2006 Micronesian Games from June 23, 2006 to July 7, 2006. (Pacific Magazine) (Pacific Daily News)
February 27: Vanuatu's Commodities Marketing Board has taken over the export of kava, Vanuatu's third largest export earner. The Fisheries and Quarantine department previously responsible for kava is protesting that VCMB does not have the expertise needed. (Radio New Zealand)
February 27: More than a quarter of the soldiers in East Timor's Army have quit in the last few weeks in protest over conditions and promotion rules. (ABC)

March
March 1: Fijian Prime Minister Laisenia Qarase announces that the 2006 Fiji general elections will be held in the second week of May from the 6th to the 13th. (Radio New Zealand)
March 2: The Pitcairn Court of Appeal dismissed the appeal against the 2004 sexual assault trial. Randall Christian's appeal against indecent assault of a girl aged under 13 was upheld, but this doesn't affect his sentence of six years on other charges. The men will now appeal to the Privy Council in London. (NZ Herald)
March 2: The United Nations working group on mercenaries asks Fiji and Papua New Guinea for permission to send a team to investigate the presence of former Fijian soldiers in Bougainville. (UNPO)
March 3: Papua New Guinea Transport and Civil Aviation Minister Don Polye announces an open air policy, which would allow other airlines to compete with Air Niugini on international routes into and from Papua New Guinea. The policy will take effect in 2007. (Pacific Magazine)
March 4: A fire damages the central Papeete power station, resulting in limited power for some areas of Tahiti for a couple of weeks. (Pacific Magazine)
March 8: Fijian President Ratu Josefa Iloilo and Vice-President Ratu Joni Madraiwiwi are re-elected to another five-year term.
March 9: The Pasifika Festival opens in Auckland New Zealand. The annual festival is the largest Pacific Islands community event. It lasts for a month, and covers cultural, sporting and business events. (Radio NZ)
March 14: The Ka Loko Reservoir dam in Kauai, Hawaii bursts, killing one man and leaving six others missing. (Honolulu StarBulletin) 
March 17: The US offers Japan the use of its military bases on Guam, after Japan refuses to pay for the relocation of 8000 marines and their families from Okinawa to Guam. (Pacific Magazine)
March 21: Solomon Islands Labour Party leader Joses Tuhanuku alleges Prime Minister Allan Kemakeza is directly implicated in corrupt aid payments by Taiwan to local politicians. (Pacific Magazine)
March 26: RFO television news in New Caledonia was cancelled for two days due to a strike in protest at the sacking of a technician. (Pacific Media Watch)
March 26: East Timor's Prime Minister, Mari Alkatiri, calls for calm after former soldiers looted shops and threw stones at opponents in Dili. 591 soldiers were dismissed from the army in the previous week after deserting their posts. (Radio NZ)
March 29: A sewer pipe leak at Waikiki in Hawaii is repaired, but several popular beaches were left polluted. (Honolulu StarBulletin)
March 30: Hiro Tefaarere, the French Polynesian minister for small and medium enterprises, resigns due to disagreements with the ruling coalition, and his failure to gain support for two development projects. (Radio NZ)
March 30: Feleti Sevele is confirmed as the new Prime Minister of Tonga. (Matangi)

April
April 2: The Human Rights Protection Party wins Samoa's general election. The HRPP was already the ruling party, and its leader Tuila'epa Sailele Malielegaoi the Prime Minister, but the party did better in the election than polls had indicated. (Radio NZ)
April 5: Air Kiribati has given redundancy notices to its staff due to a lack of revenue. Up to half the staff may be laid off. (Pacific Magazine)
April 5: Voting in Solomon Islands 2006 election is incident free. (NZ Herald)
April 6: Papua New Guinea has put an agricultural quarantine over the province of East New Britain to contain the spread of the cocoa pod borer. (Pacific Magazine)
April 18: The announcement of the new Prime Minister of the Solomon Islands, Snyder Rini, is met by riots in Honiara. Australia and New Zealand promise to send more troops to keep order. (Radio NZ)
April 20: 15,000 people march in Nouméa, New Caledonia to protest the high cost of living. The march is part of a 24-hour strike called by several trade unions. Radio NZ)

June

July

August

September

October

November

December

Arts and literature

New Books

Awards

Music

Television

Film

Web sites

Sport
2006 Micronesian Games

Deaths
February 9: Ahomee, Tongan noble, 35, heart failure
February 24: Tūtoatasi Fakafānua, Tongan noble, 44
10 September: Tāufaāhau Tupou IV, Tongan king, 88, old age

 

 
Oceania